Nadezhda Vasileva (born 23 March 1978) is a Bulgarian alpine skier. She competed at the 1998 Winter Olympics and the 2002 Winter Olympics.

References

1978 births
Living people
Bulgarian female alpine skiers
Olympic alpine skiers of Bulgaria
Alpine skiers at the 1998 Winter Olympics
Alpine skiers at the 2002 Winter Olympics
Sportspeople from Sofia